Roger Lass (born January 1, 1937) is a historical linguist, currently Emeritus Professor of Linguistics, University of Cape Town. He was previously an honorary professorial fellow at the University of Edinburgh.

Career
He earned his PhD from Yale University in 1965 in Medieval English Language and Literature, and subsequently worked at Indiana University (1964–1971), the University of Edinburgh (1972–1982), and the University of Cape Town (1983–2002).

He has done extensive work in the history of English, the motivation of sound change, and the history of linguistics. He was made an honorary professor at Edinburgh in 2014.

He was the editor of the third volume of The Cambridge History of the English Language.

A festschrift in honor of Lass was published in 1997 edited by Jacek Fisiak. A volume of the journal Language Sciences, entitled Collecting views on language change (Volume 24, Issues 3–4, May–July 2002, edited by Raymond Hickey) was dedicated to Lass on his sixty fifth birthday. Other essays in his honor were published in the book Motives for Language Change (CUP 2003).

Books
 Historical linguistics and language change
 Old English: A Historical Linguistic Companion
 The Shape of English
 Phonology: An Introduction to Basic Concepts
 Language and Time: A Historian's View
 On Explaining Language Change
 English Phonology and Phonological Theory
 Old English Phonology, with John Mathieson Anderson
 Approaches to English historical linguistics

References

1937 births
Living people
Historical linguists of English
Yale University alumni
Academics of the University of Edinburgh
British phonologists
Philosophers of linguistics
Academic staff of the University of Cape Town
Indiana University faculty